Ombrotrophic ("cloud-fed"), from Ancient Greek ὄμβρος (ómvros) meaning "rain" and τροφή (trofí) meaning "food"), refers to soils or vegetation which receive all of their water and nutrients from precipitation, rather than from streams or springs. Such environments are hydrologically isolated from the surrounding landscape, and since rain is acidic and very low in nutrients, they are home to organisms tolerant of acidic, low-nutrient environments. The vegetation of ombrotrophic peatlands is often bog, dominated by Sphagnum mosses. The hydrology of these environments are directly related to their climate, as precipitation is the water and nutrient source, and temperatures dictate how quickly water evaporates from these systems.

Ombrotrophic circumstances may occur even in landscapes composed of limestone or other nutrient-rich substrates – for example, in high-rainfall areas, limestone boulders may be capped by acidic ombrotrophic bog vegetation. Epiphytic vegetation (plants growing on other plants) is ombrotrophic.

In contrast to ombrotrophic environments, minerotrophic environments are those where the water supply comes mainly from streams or springs. This water has flowed over or through rocks often acquiring dissolved chemicals which raise the nutrient levels and reduce the acidity, which leads to different vegetation such as fen or poor fen.

See also 

 Chalk heath
 Mire

Notes

References
 Charman, D., Peatlands and Environmental Change. John Wiley & Sons, 2002. 

Pedology